Patrick Harrison (born 20 June 2002) is a Scottish rugby union player for Edinburgh Rugby in the United Rugby Championship. Harrison's primary position is hooker.

Rugby Union career

Professional career
Harrison signed for Edinburgh academy in June 2020.

He joined London Irish on a short-term loan on the 20 September 2022.

External links
itsrugby.co.uk Profile
Edinburgh Profile

References

2002 births
Living people
Rugby union players from Edinburgh
Scottish rugby union players
Edinburgh Rugby players
Rugby union hookers
Wasps RFC players
London Irish players